This electoral calendar 2007 lists the national/federal direct elections held in 2007 in the de jure and de facto sovereign states and their dependent territories. Referendums are included, although they are not elections. By-elections are not included.

January
 19 January: Democratic Republic of the Congo, Senate
 21 January: Serbia, National Assembly
 21 January: Mauritania, Senate (1st Round)
 25 January: Gambia, Parliament
 27 January: Democratic Republic of the Congo, Governors (1st Round)

February
 4 February: Mauritania, Senate (2nd Round)
 9 February: Turks and Caicos Islands, Parliament
 11 February: Turkmenistan, President
 11 February: Portugal, Referendum on abortion
 15 February: Democratic Republic of the Congo, Governors (2nd Round)
 17 February: Lesotho, National Assembly
 25 February: Senegal, President

March
 4 March: Estonia, Parliament
 4 March: Abkhazia, Parliament (1st Round)
 6 March: Micronesia, Parliament
 11 March: Mauritania, President (1st Round)
 18 March: Abkhazia, Parliament (2nd Round)
 18 March: Finland, Parliament
 25 March: Hong Kong, Chief Executive
 25 March: Mauritania, President (2nd Round)
 26 March: Egypt, Constitutional referendum
 31 March: Benin, National Assembly

April
 1 April: Wallis and Futuna, Territorial Assembly
 4 April: Madagascar, Constitutional referendum
 9 April: East Timor, President (1st Round)
 15 April: Ecuador, Referendum on Constituent Assembly
 21 April: Nigeria, President and Parliament
 22 April: France, President (1st Round)
 22 April: Syria, Parliament
 27 April: Turkey, President (1st Round)
 29 April: Mali, President

May
 2 May: Bahamas, Parliament
 6 May: Turkey, President (2nd Round)
 6 May: France, President (2nd round)
 6 May: Burkina Faso, National Assembly
 9 May: East Timor, President (2nd round)
 10 – 12 May: Seychelles, Parliament
 11 May: Federated States of Micronesia, President
 12 May: Armenia, Parliament
 12 May: Iceland, Parliament
 14 May: Philippines, Senate (one half Senators elected in 2001), House of Representatives and Local
 17 May: Algeria, Parliament
 19 May: Romania, Referendum to impeach the president
 20 May: Vietnam, Parliament
 20 May: Bulgaria, European Union Parliament
 24 May: Ireland, Parliament
 27 May: Syria, President
 31 May: Latvia, President

June
 3 June: Senegal, Parliament
 10 June: Belgium, Parliament
 10 June: France, Legislature (1st Round)
 11 June: Egypt, Shura Council
 12 June: U.S. Virgin Islands, Constitutional Convention
 13 June: Israel, President
 16 June: Samoa, President
 17 June: France, Legislature (2nd Round)
 20 June: Albania, President (1st Round)
 24 June: Republic of the Congo, Parliament (1st round)
 27 June: Albania, President (2nd Round)
 30 June: East Timor, Parliament
 30 June – 10 July: Papua New Guinea, Parliament

July
 1 July: Mali, Parliament (1st round)
 1 July: Saint Barthelemy, Territorial Council
 1 July: Saint Martin, Territorial Council (1st Round)
 7 July: Latvia, Referendum on security laws
 8 July: Saint Martin, Territorial Council (1st Round)
 8 July: Albania, President (3rd Round)
 11 July: Albania, President (3rd Round)
 14 July: Albania, President (4th Round)
 19 July: India, President
 19 July: Nagorno-Karabakh, President
 20 July: Albania, President (5th Round)
 22 July: Cameroon, Parliament
 22 July: Turkey, Parliament
 22 July: Mali, Parliament (2nd round)
 24 July: Vietnam, President
 29 July: Japan, House of Councillors

August
 5 August: Republic of the Congo, Parliament (2nd round)
 11 August: Sierra Leone, President and Parliament
 18 August: Kazakhstan, Parliament
 18 August: Maldives, Constitutional referendum
 19 August: Thailand, Referendum on the new constitution
 20 August: British Virgin Islands, Legislature
 20 August: Turkey, President (3rd Round)
 22 August: Kiribati, Parliament (1st Round)
 24 August: Turkey, President (4th Round)
 25 August: Nauru, Parliament
 28 August: Nauru, President
 28 August: Turkey, President (5th Round)
 30 August: Kiribati, Parliament (2nd Round)

September
 3 September: Jamaica, Parliament
 7 September: Morocco, Parliament
 9 September: Guatemala, President (1st Round) and Parliament
 16 September: Greece, Parliament
 23 September: Madagascar, Parliament
 30 September: Ecuador, Constituent Assembly
 30 September: Ukraine, Parliament

October
 6 October: Pakistan, President
 7 October: Costa Rica, Referendum on DR-CAFTA
 9 October: Ethiopia, President
 11 October: Gibraltar, Parliament
 14 October: Togo, Parliament
 17 October: Kiribati, President
 20 October: Tokelau, Referendum on self-determination (1st Round)
 21 October: Switzerland, Federal
 21 October: Åland, Legislative
 21 October: Slovenia, President (1st Round)
 21 October: Turkey, Constitutional referendum
 21 October: Poland, Parliament
 21 October: Kyrgyzstan, Constitutional referendum
 22 – 24 October: Tokelau, Referendum on self-determination (2nd Round)
 27 October: Oman, Assembly
 28 October: Argentina, President and Parliament
 29 October: Philippines, Local

November
 3 November: Northern Mariana Islands, Legislature
 4 November: Guatemala, President (2nd round)
 5 November: Trinidad and Tobago, Parliament
 11 November: Slovenia, President (2nd round)
 13 November: Denmark, Parliament
 17 November: Kosovo, Parliament
 19 November: Marshall Islands, Legislature
 20 November: Jordan, Parliament
 24 November: Australia, Parliament
 25 November: Croatia, Parliament
 25 November: Romania, European Union Parliament
 25 November: Romania, Voting system referendum

December
 2 December: Russia, Legislative 
 2 December: Venezuela, Referendum on constitutional changes
 9 December: Turkmenistan, People's Council
 9 December: Pitcairn Islands, General
 12 December: Switzerland, Federal Council (indirect)
 16 December: Kyrgyzstan, Parliament
 18 December: Bermuda, Parliament
 19 December: South Korea, President
 23 December: Thailand, Parliament
 23 December: Uzbekistan, President
 27 December: Kenya, President and Parliament
 31 December: Bhutan, National Council

See also
 Canadian electoral calendar, 2007

 
Political timelines of the 2000s by year